This article show all participating team squads at the 2002 FIVB Women's Volleyball World Grand Prix, played by eight countries from 12 July to 4 August 2002 with the final round held in Hong Kong Coliseum, Hong Kong.

The following is the Brazil roster in the 2002 FIVB World Grand Prix.

The following is the China roster in the 2002 FIVB World Grand Prix.

The following is the Cuba roster in the 2002 FIVB World Grand Prix.

The following is the Germany roster in the 2002 FIVB World Grand Prix.

The following is the Japan roster in the 2002 FIVB World Grand Prix.

The following is the Russia roster in the 2002 FIVB World Grand Prix.

The following is the Thailand roster in the 2002 FIVB World Grand Prix.

The following is the United States roster in the 2002 FIVB World Grand Prix.

References

External links
FIVB
Teams Composition at FIVB.org

2002
2002 in volleyball
International volleyball competitions hosted by Hong Kong
2002 in Hong Kong sport